Cities and towns of republic significance
Elista (Элиста) (capital)
Districts:
Chernozemelsky (Черноземельский)
with 8 rural administrations under the district's jurisdiction.
Gorodovikovsky (Городовиковский)
Towns under the district's jurisdiction:
Gorodovikovsk (Городовиковск)
with 6 rural administrations under the district's jurisdiction.
Iki-Burulsky (Ики-Бурульский)
with 13 rural administrations under the district's jurisdiction.
Ketchenerovsky (Кетченеровский)
with 9 rural administrations under the district's jurisdiction.
Lagansky (Лаганский)
Towns under the district's jurisdiction:
Lagan (Лагань)
with 4 rural administrations under the district's jurisdiction.
Maloderbetovsky (Малодербетовский)
with 6 rural administrations under the district's jurisdiction.
Oktyabrsky (Октябрьский)
with 7 rural administrations under the district's jurisdiction.
Priyutnensky (Прию́тненский)
with 8 rural administrations under the district's jurisdiction.
Sarpinsky (Сарпинский)
with 9 rural administrations under the district's jurisdiction.
Tselinny (Целинный)
with 11 rural administrations under the district's jurisdiction.
Yashaltinsky (Яшалтинский)
with 11 rural administrations under the district's jurisdiction.
Yashkulsky (Яшкульский)
with 12 rural administrations under the district's jurisdiction.
Yustinsky (Юстинский)
with 7 rural administrations under the district's jurisdiction.

References

Kalmykia
Kalmykia